The Duluth Transit Authority (DTA) is the transit agency that provides mass transit service — currently, only buses — in the city of Duluth, Minnesota, United States.  The agency also serves nearby Proctor, Minnesota, and Superior, Wisconsin, as well as the eastern edge of Hermantown, Minnesota.

The organization was formed in 1969 by the Minnesota State Legislature.

In 2009, the DTA was named Transit System of the Year by the Minnesota Public Transit Association.

Operation
Express service is provided during rush hours to New Duluth (2X), Proctor (3X), Lakeside (7X – PM only), Superior (16X – PM only), and Hermantown (20X). 
During peak hours, an average of 45 buses will be in service at any one time. The transit agency also owns three park-and-ride lots and has bike racks on the front of every bus.

As of 2009, the DTA had 6 hybrid buses in service.

Ridership
According to the agency, the system carried 3.26 million riders in 2011, a 3% increase from 2010.

Duluth Transit Authority is the Minnesota's third-largest transit system by ridership, after the Metro Transit and University of Minnesota Campus Shuttle systems in Minneapolis – Saint Paul.

Routes
This list is derived from the current DTA system map.
 1 Grand Ave Zoo
 2 New Duluth
 3 Proctor
 4 Ramsey – Raleigh via West 8th
 5 West to the Mall
 6 East Mainline/UMD
 7 East Mainline/Lakeside
 8 Downtown to LSC - Mall
 9 Piedmont
 9M Piedmont/Mall 
 10 Duluth Heights/Mall
 10H Duluth Heights/Mall/Southeast 6th
 10E Duluth Heights/Ecklund
 11 East 8th–UMD
 11K East 8th–UMD – Kenwood
 11M East 8th–UMD – Morley Heights
 12 Kenwood – UMD
 13 Woodland - East 4th - UMD
 14 West 4th Blvd
 15 Park Point
 16 Superior
 17 Tower Ave
 18 Duluth Heights-UMD
 23 UMD Circulator
 24 Aquarium/DECC Loop
 S1 Grocery Express
 Port Town Trolley (Operates Summers Only)

Duluth Transportation Center

Duluth Transportation Center (DTC) is the downtown hub for the Duluth transit system.

The DTC was built in February 2016, replacing an existing parking ramp. The building was designed by LHB Corporation and constructed by Mortenson Construction.

The DTC has eight docks for boarding buses, with space for layovers. Skyways to nearby buildings were replaced during construction, improving pedestrian access.

See also
 List of bus transit systems in the United States

References

Bus transportation in Minnesota
Bus transportation in Wisconsin
Transportation in Duluth, Minnesota
1969 establishments in Minnesota